This is a list of what are intended to be the notable top hotels by country, five or four star hotels, notable skyscraper landmarks or historic hotels which are covered in multiple reliable publications. It should not be a directory of every hotel in every country:

Yemen
 Gold Mohur Hotel, Aden
Sultan Palace Hotel, Sanaa

Zimbabwe
Harare International Conference Center
Meikles
Victoria Falls Hotel

References

Y